The alphanumeric designation CA-12, CA 12 or CA12 may refer to:

CA12, the carbonic anhydrase 12 enzyme and the gene that encodes it
California's 12th congressional district
California State Route 12, a highway in California
CAC Boomerang, a WWII fighter aircraft manufactured by the Commonwealth Aircraft Corporation in Australia
Comp Air 12, a civil utility aircraft manufactured by Comp Air Inc. in the USA
USS North Carolina (ACR-12), an early 20th-century U.S. Navy armoured cruiser, later renamed USS Charlotte (CA-12)